"Son of a Preacher Man" is a song written and composed by American songwriters John Hurley and Ronnie Wilkins and recorded by British singer Dusty Springfield in September 1968 for the album Dusty in Memphis.

Springfield's version was produced by Jerry Wexler, Tom Dowd, and Arif Mardin for her first album for the Atlantic Records label. The single, released in late 1968 and 
credited as "Son-of-a Preacher Man" on UK, US and other releases, became an international hit, reaching no. 9 in the UK singles chart and no. 10 on  Billboard's Hot 100 in January 1969. The album Dusty in Memphis was released in stereo, though its singles were remixed and released in mono. 

"Son of a Preacher Man" was Springfield's last Top 30 hit until 1987, when her collaboration with UK synthpop duo the Pet Shop Boys yielded the huge hit "What Have I Done to Deserve This?". "Son of a Preacher Man" found a new audience when it was included on the soundtrack of Quentin Tarantino's 1994 film Pulp Fiction; a re-release of the single reached number one in Iceland in 1995.

Origins
In 1968, songwriters John Hurley and Ronnie Wilkins (who had recently had a hit with "Love of the Common People") wrote the song with Aretha Franklin in mind, according to a 2009 interview with Wilkins. Atlantic Records producer and co-owner Jerry Wexler, who was recording Dusty Springfield's first Atlantic album in Memphis at the time, liked the song and suggested it to Springfield for the Dusty in Memphis album.

Following Springfield's top-10 single release, the song was recorded in 1969 by Franklin for her This Girl's in Love with You album. Franklin's version also appeared as the B-side of her hit single "Call Me". Franklin's older sister Erma Franklin also recorded the song and included it on her 1969 Brunswick album Soul Sister.

Reception and legacy
Cash Box said that Springfield "shows a new soul" and that the song is "brim-full of the special southern-combo sound and a vocal strongly influenced by Aretha [Franklin]."

The writers of Rolling Stone magazine placed Dusty Springfield's recording at number 77 among "The 100 Best Singles of the Last 25 Years" in 1987. The record was placed at number 43 among the "Greatest Singles of All Time",  by the writers of New Musical Express in 2002, and in 2004, the song was on the Rolling Stone list of "The 500 Greatest Songs of All Time".

In 1994, the song was featured in a scene of the film Pulp Fiction. "Son of a Preacher Man" helped to sell more than two million units of the film's soundtrack and to help it reach number six on the charts, according to SoundScan. Quentin Tarantino has been quoted, on the "Collectors Edition" DVD of Pulp Fiction, as saying that he probably would not have filmed the scene in which the song is featured had he not been able to use it.

In 2001, Emma Wilkinson's UK television performance of "Son of a Preacher Man" won the Grand Final of the talent show Stars in Their Eyes garnering the most votes from 15 million television viewers.

Samples from "Son of a Preacher Man" were used on Cypress Hill's "Hits from the Bong" on their album Black Sunday. The song is also featured in the 2016 video game Mafia III.

Charts

Certifications

See also
 Preacher's kid

References

External links
[ Son of a Preacher Man] at AllMusic

1968 singles
1968 songs
Aretha Franklin songs
Atlantic Records singles
Dusty Springfield songs
Farmer's Daughter songs
Liza Minnelli songs
Number-one singles in Iceland
Philips Records singles
Sherrié Austin songs
Skeeter Davis songs
Song recordings produced by Arif Mardin
Song recordings produced by Jerry Wexler
Song recordings produced by Tom Dowd
Sylvia Vrethammar songs